In applied mathematics, discretization is the process of transferring continuous functions, models, variables, and equations into discrete counterparts.  This process is usually carried out as a first step toward making them suitable for numerical evaluation and implementation on digital computers. Dichotomization is the special case of discretization in which the number of discrete classes is 2, which can approximate a continuous variable as a binary variable (creating a dichotomy for modeling purposes, as in binary classification).

Discretization is also related to discrete mathematics, and is an important component of granular computing.  In this context, discretization may also refer to modification of variable or category granularity, as when multiple discrete variables are aggregated or multiple discrete categories fused.

Whenever continuous data is discretized, there is always some amount of discretization error. The goal is to reduce the amount to a level considered negligible for the modeling purposes at hand.

 The terms discretization  and quantization often have the same denotation but not always identical connotations. (Specifically, the two terms share a semantic field.) The same is true of discretization error and quantization error.

Mathematical methods relating to discretization include the Euler–Maruyama method and the zero-order hold.

Discretization of linear state space models  
Discretization is also concerned with the transformation of continuous differential equations into discrete difference equations, suitable for numerical computing.

The following continuous-time state space model

where v and w are continuous zero-mean white noise sources with power spectral densities

can be discretized, assuming zero-order hold for the input u and continuous integration for the noise v, to

with covariances

where

, if  is nonsingular

The equation for the discretized measurement noise is a consequence of the continuous measurement noise being defined with a power spectral density.

A clever trick to compute Ad and Bd in one step is by utilizing the following property:

Where and are the discretized state-space matrices.

Discretization of process noise 
It can, however, be computed by first constructing a matrix, and computing the exponential of it

The discretized process noise is then evaluated by multiplying the transpose of the lower-right partition of G with the upper-right partition of G:

Derivation 
Starting with the continuous model

we know that the matrix exponential is

and by premultiplying the model we get

which we recognize as

and by integrating..

which is an analytical solution to the continuous model.

Now we want to discretise the above expression. We assume that u is constant during each timestep.

Note that . We also assume that  is constant during the integral, which in turn yields

which is an exact solution to the discretization problem.

When  is singular, the latter expression can still be used by replacing  by its Taylor expansion,
 
This yields
 
which is the form used in practice.

Approximations 
Exact discretization may sometimes be intractable due to the heavy matrix exponential and integral operations involved. It is much easier to calculate an approximate discrete model, based on that for small timesteps . The approximate solution then becomes:

This is also known as the Euler method, which is also known as the forward Euler method. Each of these approximations has different stability properties. The bilinear transform preserves the instability of the continuous-time system.

Discretization of continuous features 

In statistics and machine learning, discretization refers to the process of converting continuous features or variables to discretized or nominal features. This can be useful when creating probability mass functions.

Discretization of smooth functions 

In generalized functions theory, discretization 
arises as a particular case of the Convolution Theorem 
on tempered distributions

 
 

where  is the Dirac comb,
 is discretization,  is 
periodization,  is a rapidly decreasing tempered distribution 
(e.g. a Dirac delta function  or any other 
compactly supported function),  is a smooth, 
slowly growing
ordinary function (e.g. the function that is constantly 
or any other band-limited function)
Functions  which are not smooth can be made smooth using a mollifier prior to discretization.

As an example, discretization of the function that is constantly  yields the sequence  which, interpreted as the coefficients of a linear combination of Dirac delta functions, forms a Dirac comb. If additionally truncation is applied, one obtains finite sequences, e.g. . They are discrete in both, time and frequency.

See also
Discrete event simulation
Discrete space
Discrete time and continuous time
Finite difference method
Finite volume method for unsteady flow
Smoothing
Stochastic simulation
Time-scale calculus

References

Further reading

External links

Numerical analysis
Applied mathematics
Functional analysis
Iterative methods
Control theory